Harrison School may refer to:

in Australia
perhaps there is a school in Harrison, Australian Capital Territory?

in the United States

Harrison High School (disambiguation), any one of numerous schools in many states

Or, (by state):
Harrison School (St. Louis, Missouri), NRHP-listed
William H. Harrison School, Philadelphia, PA, listed on the NRHP in North Philadelphia, Pennsylvania
Harrison School (Roanoke, Virginia), listed on the NRHP in Roanoke, Virginia

See also
Harrison High School (disambiguation)
Harrison Building (disambiguation)